Zakir Ali is a former Indian politician and Member of Legislative Assembly of Uttar Pradesh India. He represents the Loni constituency of Uttar Pradesh and is a member of the Samajwadi Party political party.

Early life and education
Zakir Ali was born in  Delhi. He is educated till tenth grade (alma mater not known) .

Political career
Zakir Ali has been a MLA for one term. He represented the Loni constituency and is a member of the Samajwadi Party political party.

Posts held

References 

Samajwadi Party politicians from Uttar Pradesh
Uttar Pradesh MLAs 2012–2017
People from Ghaziabad district, India
1978 births
Living people